Aroue-Ithorots-Olhaïby is a commune in the Pyrénées-Atlantiques department in the Nouvelle-Aquitaine region of south-western France.

The inhabitants of the commune are known as Arouetarrak.

Geography

Aroue-Ithorots-Olhaïby is located in the former Basque province of Soule some 10 km east of Saint-Palais and 10 km south of Sauveterre-de-Béarn. Access to the commune is by the D11 road from Domezain-Berraute in the west passing through the west fork of the commune then Etcharry then the east fork and the village before continuing south-east to Charritte-de-Bas. The commune is mixed forest and farmland.

Located in the Drainage basin of the Adour, the commune is traversed from south to north by the Lafoure (a tributary of the Saison) with its tributary the Hourquet and the Lauhirasse with its tributary the Thiancoenia erreka.

Places and Hamlets

 Abbadie (château)
 Aïntcia
 Aitzaguer
 Aroue
 Bagardoy
 Bartulague
 Begorre
 Beheria
 Benoscar (Forest)
 Bentaberria
 Berhon
 Berrogain
 Bethe
 Bidauria
 Bohoteguia
 Bouhaben
 Carriquiry
 Ertorraenia
 Etchebarnia
 Etcheberria
 Etchecoin
 Etchelecu
 Etchemborde
 Eyherabide
 Garay
 Guestereguia
 Hagoua
 Harguina
 Harguinaborda
 Ithorots
 Jaureguiberria
 Joantho (château)
 Landaco
 Landuchia
 Larraburuzahar
 Larrartia
 Lassartia
 Linchinbiague
 Mendiburia
 Mendicoi
 Mendionde
 Metcha (Mill)
 Olhaïby
 Olhassaria
 Oxaïby
 Oxart
 Oxidoya
 Oyhamburia
 Oyhenart-Chipi
 Oyhençabal
 Pagueguy
 Poulit
 Quillilauquy
 Salla
 Sallagaray
 Saubidet

Toponymy
The commune name in basque is Arüe-Ithorrotze-Olhaibi.

Jean-Baptiste Orpustan indicated that Ithorots possibly signified "source of cold water" and Olhaïby "the ford of the huts".

The following table details the origins of the commune name and other names in the commune.

Sources:
Orpustan: Jean-Baptiste Orpustan,   New Basque Toponymy on the page numbers indicated in the table.
Raymond: Topographic Dictionary of the Department of Basses-Pyrenees, 1863, on the page numbers indicated in the table. 
Cassini: Cassini Map from 1750
EHESS (1): 
EHESS (2): 

Origins:
Duchesne: Duchesne collection volume CXIV
Ohix: Contracts retained by Ohix, Notary of Soule
Luntz:
Military: Military Inspection of Béarn
Languedoc: Confessions of Languedoc)
Reformation: Reformation of Béarn
Arthez-Lasalle: Titles of Arthez-Lassalle

History
Paul Raymond noted on page 11 of his 1863 dictionary that Aroue was one of the seven districts of Soule and depended on the messagerie of Barhoue. There was a Lay Abbey at Ithorots, vassal of the Viscounts of Soule. The fief of Olhaïby was a vassal of the Viscounts of Soule and its owner was one of ten potestats of Soule.

The commune had a "Temple of Reason" during the French Revolution, undoubtedly because in the Béarnais region, Aroue was the only Basque commune to adopt the Jacobin anti-religion policy.

Between 1790 and 1794 Ithorots commune was merged with Olhaïby to form the new commune of Ithorots-Olhaïby. On 1 August 1973 (by prefectural order of 20 July 1973), the commune of Aroue merged with Ithorots-Olhaïby to form the new commune of Aroue-Ithorots-Olhaïby.

Administration

List of Successive Mayors

Inter-communality
The commune is part of eight inter-communal structures:
 the Communauté d'agglomération du Pays Basque;
 the AEP association of Pays de Mixe;
 the AEP association of Pays de Soule;
 the educational regrouping association of Arbérats-Sillègue, Arbouet-Sussaute, Aroue, and Etcharry;
 the Energy association of Pyrénées-Atlantiques;
 the inter-communal association for the functioning of schools in Amikuze;
 the joint forestry association for oaks in the Basque and béarnais valleys;
 the association to support Basque culture.

Demography
In 2017 the commune had 240 inhabitants. The population data given in the table and graph below for 1968 and earlier refer to the former commune of Aroue.

Economy
The town is part of the Appellation d'origine contrôlée (AOC) zone of Ossau-iraty.

Culture and Heritage

Civil heritage
The village has architecture typical of the eastern Basque Country: gable roofs covered with tiles, whitewashed walls with houses from the 16th century.

As in many Basque villages, the fronton is adjacent to the church.

Religious heritage
Two churches are registered as historical monuments:
The Church of Saint-Étienne at Aroue (12th century) is a Romanesque church rebuilt in the 19th century. There is a sculpture from the 12th century of Saint Jacques on a horse and a Spanish image of "Matamoro".
The Church of Saint-Samson at Ithorots (19th century)
The Church at Olhaïby has several items that are registered as historical objects:
A Retable over the main altar (18th century)
A Candlestick (17th century)
An altar cross (18th century)
A tabernacle at the main altar (18th century)
A candlestick (18th century)
Statuettes (18th century)
A Painting: The Martyrdom of Saints Cyr and Judith (18th century)
A Tabernacle, Retable, 2 Candlesticks, Statues, Altar Cross, and Painting (18th century)
A Processional Cross (18th century)

Environmental heritage
The town lies on the GR 65. It is at the beginning of the 7th section of the GR which is listed by UNESCO as World Heritage. The presentation file to UNESCO locates the commune on the Via Podiensis on the Way of St. James. There is no real historical justification for this but it is an important fact for this small town. Justification was found by Dr. Urrutibetehy, the pioneer who traced the paths in the region (it was he who set up the so-called Stele of Gibraltar'' and made a point of convergence of these paths). He saw in the horseman shown on the lintel of the door of the sacristy, a representation of Saint Jacques Matamoros.

Notable people linked to the communeFranz Duboscq''', born in Saint-Jean-de-Luz in 1924, MP and senator, former president of the council and mayor of the town until 2001.

See also
Communes of the Pyrénées-Atlantiques department

References

External links
ITHORROTZE and OLHAIBI in the Bernardo Estornés Lasa - Auñamendi Encyclopedia (Euskomedia Fundazioa) 
Aroue and the 7th stage of GR 65 registered as World Heritage 
Aroue-Ithorots-Olhaïby on Géoportail, National Geographic Institute (IGN) website 
Aroüe, Ittorrotz, and Olliaybi on the 1750 Cassini Map

Communes of Pyrénées-Atlantiques